Ethiopia competed at the 2004 Summer Olympics in Athens, Greece from 13 to 29 August 2004. It was represented by 26 athletes in Greece, of whom 24 of them participated in athletics events, mainly in the country's specialty of long distance running. Two athletes competed in boxing.

Medalists

Athletics 

Ethiopian athletes have so far achieved qualifying standards in the following athletics events (up to a maximum of 3 athletes in each event at the 'A' Standard, and 1 at the 'B' Standard). 

Men
Track & road events

Women
Track & road events

Key
Note–Ranks given for track events are within the athlete's heat only
Q = Qualified for the next round
q = Qualified for the next round as a fastest loser or, in field events, by position without achieving the qualifying target
NR = National record
N/A = Round not applicable for the event
Bye = Athlete not required to compete in round

Boxing

References

External links
Official Report of the XXVIII Olympiad
Ethiopian Olympic Committee

2004 in Ethiopian sport
Nations at the 2004 Summer Olympics
2004